Albrechtičky is a municipality and village in the Nový Jičín District in the Moravian-Silesian Region of the Czech Republic. It has about 700 inhabitants.

Transport
The area of Leoš Janáček Airport Ostrava partially lies in the municipal territory.

References

External links

 

Villages in Nový Jičín District